Annequin is a commune in the Pas-de-Calais department in the Hauts-de-France region of France.

Geography

Coal mining

Excavation of Mine 9 by the Compagnie des mines de Béthune began at Annequin in 1893.
Mine 9 began production in 1896, ventilated by shaft 4bis.
It was connected to Mine 9 and was used only for ventilation.
Mine 9 was closed in 1964 and Shaft 12 in 1965.

Population

Sights
 The church of St. Martin, dating from the twentieth century.
 Remains of a 13th-century castle, destroyed in 1820.
 The war memorial.

See also
Communes of the Pas-de-Calais department

References

External links

 The CWGC communal cemetery

Communes of Pas-de-Calais